We Speak NYC is an Emmy Award-winning series that depicts the lives of working class immigrants who come from all over the world to make New York City their home. It's created by the Mayor's Office of Immigrant Affairs and The City University of New York with the purpose of helping adult immigrants for whom English is a second language to improve their English by watching the series and also to learn about their rights to City and community services.

We Speak NYC episodes address issues of relevance to adult immigrants, such as navigating the school system, advocating for healthcare solutions and finding free or low-cost health insurance, responding to domestic violence, getting help with stress and anxiety, learning about and asserting your worker rights, getting free immigration legal help, accessing social services, preparing for a career, and many other important topics. Previously known as We Are New York, its purpose is to help adult immigrants, for whom English is a second language, to improve their understanding of English by watching the series, and also to learn about their rights to city and community services.

In May 2018, the Mayor's Office of Immigrant Affairs launched the second season of We Speak NYC.

Cast and characters

Season 1

Regular cast

 Arturo Castro as Jorge
 Jennica Carmona as Carmen
 Irma Estella La Guerre as Rosa
 Alberto Vazquez as Fernando
 Sándor Técsy as Sasha
 Mahadeo Shivraj as Rishi
 Angel Garcia Clemente as Juan
 Vincent D'Arbouze as Pierre
 Alexander Flores as Diego
 Kenneth Maharaj as Abdul
 Bones Rodriguez as Mario
 Antonia Rey as Mrs. Medina
 Shirine Babb as Efie

Season 2

Regular cast

 Arunima Roy as Shumi
 Tien-Li Wu as Ms. Wu
 Brianna Fernandez as Gabriela
 Arisael Rivera as César
 Savannah Renée Rodriguez as Xio
 Ariel Pacheco as Rolando
 Barbara Eliodorio as Claudia
 David Serero as Omar
 Besanya Santiago as Silvia
 Jose Martinez as Luis
 Jane Gendelman as Mrs. Belkina
 Sonam Wangdue as Sonam
 Pedro Fontaine as Gidel
 Sumant Gupta as Osman
 Simone Xi as Lian
 Robert Garcia Cabrera as Martin
 Soto Silva as Rafaela
 Julissa Roman as Alicia

Episodes

Series overview

Season 1 (2009)
We Speak NYC previously known as We Are New York (WANY) is an Emmy Award-winning educational television series produced by the NYC Mayor's Office of Immigrant Affairs and The City University of New York in 2009. The 10-episode comedic drama is based on true-to-life stories of immigrants making their way in New York City. Each episode provides useful information on essential City services and shows how people working across ethnic lines can access resources and solve common problems.

Immigrants learning English have found the show especially helpful because the production values (e.g., actors speaking clearly and slowly directly into the camera; repetition of key vocabulary; subtitles in six languages: Arabic, Bengali, Chinese, English, Russian and Spanish etc., make the content accessible in ways unlike any other English-language TV show. Viewers want to watch the show because they can understand the English, the storyline is filled with topics that are relevant to their everyday lives, and the cast reflects the demographics of the city's immigrant population. The working class immigrant heroes of We Speak NYC contend with asthma and diabetes; they find ways to support their children's education and prevent teenagers from dropping out; and they figure out the banking system.

Season 2 (2018-2022)
We Speak NYCs second season features important issues facing New Yorkers, including mental health, workers’ rights, senior care, food help, immigrant rights, work search and early childhood education. Stories in season 2 weaves into a description of the services and resources available from the city. It's all part of empowering New Yorkers to advocate for their needs and thereby making NYC "the fairest big city in the country".

Reception
The series received positive reviews. Mayor Bill de Blasio praised the series and its unique mission. "Effective English learning programs like We Speak NYC open new doors for New Yorkers," said Mayor Bill de Blasio. "Though we are a city that proudly speaks over 150 languages, many residents want to improve their English language skills, and we want to meet them with the tools to do it. Empowering immigrant communities with the skills and knowledge to take advantage of more opportunities is how we make the ultimate city of immigrants an even better place for all of our residents."

In May 2019, We Speak NYC received its third NY Emmy Award for Rolando's Rights episode in the category for Informational/Instruction Programming.

References

External links
 
 
 

2009 American television series debuts
English-language television shows
Television shows filmed in New York City
Television series about families
2000s American comedy-drama television series
2010s American comedy-drama television series